Halil İbrahim Dervişoğlu (born 8 December 1999) is a professional footballer who plays as a forward for  club Burnley, on loan from  club Brentford. Born in Netherlands, he represents the Turkey national team.

Dervişoğlu began his career in his native Netherlands with Sparta Rotterdam and transferred to Brentford in 2020.

Club career

Sparta Rotterdam 
Dervişoğlu joined the Sparta Rotterdam academy at the age of 10 and broke into the club's reserve team early in the 2017–18 Tweede Divisie season. 21 goals in 26 appearances saw him sign a contract extension in May 2018 and he made his maiden first team appearances during the club's unsuccessful Eredivisie relegation playoff campaign. Dervişoğlu was a regular in the first team squad during the 2018–19 Eerste Divisie season and he helped the club to promotion back to the Eredivisie through the end-of-season playoffs.

In August 2019, Dervişoğlu signed a pre-contract to depart Het Kasteel on 1 January 2020. He made 19 appearances and scored five goals during the first half of the 2019–20 season and departed the club having made 58 appearances and scored 16 goals while a member of the first team squad.

Brentford 
On 9 August 2019, Dervişoğlu signed a pre-contract to join English Championship club Brentford on 1 January 2020, for a reported €3 million fee. He signed a -year contract and was unveiled as a Brentford player on 3 January 2020. Down the pecking order for the attacking positions, Dervişoğlu made 7 appearances during the remainder of the 2019–20 season, which ended with defeat in the 2020 Championship play-off Final.

After making just one EFL Cup substitute appearance during the first month of the 2020–21 season and well behind Marcus Forss and new signing Ivan Toney in the centre forward pecking order, Dervişoğlu joined Eredivisie club FC Twente on loan until the end of the 2020–21 season. After making 10 appearances without scoring, his loan was recalled on the first day of the mid-season transfer window. Dervişoğlu scored his first goal for the club on his first appearance back, with the opener in a 2–1 FA Cup third round win over Middlesbrough on 9 January 2021. It proved to be his only appearance before he departed to join Turkish Süper Lig club Galatasaray on loan two weeks later. After a slow start to his Galatasaray spell due to testing positive for COVID-19, Dervişoğlu broke from his substitute role into the starting lineup late in the season, scoring three goals in the final four matches, though the club ultimately missed out on the Süper Lig title by one goal. He finished his spell with 12 appearances and three goals and in his absence, Brentford won promotion to the Premier League after victory in the 2021 Championship play-off Final.

Despite being named in each of head coach Thomas Frank's first four matchday squads of the 2021–22 season, Dervişoğlu made just one appearance, with a start in a 3–1 EFL Cup second round win over Forest Green Rovers. On 1 September 2021, for reasons of it being a "logical progression" for Dervişoğlu "to continue to play and develop", he rejoined Galatasaray on loan until the end of the 2021–22 season. He made 33 appearances and scored five goals during a mid-table season.

Dervişoğlu made just one seven-minute substitute cameo during the opening month of the 2022–23 Premier League season and well down the attacking pecking order, he joined Championship club Burnley on a season-long loan on the final day of the summer transfer window.

International career
Of Turkish descent, Dervişoğlu was eligible to represent the Netherlands or Turkey at international level. Capped by Turkey at U19 and U21 level, Dervişoğlu was named in Turkey's Euro 2020 squad and made his senior international debut in a pre-tournament friendly versus Azerbaijan on 27 May 2021. He started the match and scored the opening goal in the 2–1 victory. Dervişoğlu made two substitute appearances at Euro 2020, prior to Turkey's group stage exit.

Career statistics

Club

International 

 Scores and results list Turkey's goal tally first, score column indicates score after each Dervişoğlu goal.

Honours 
Sparta Rotterdam

 Eerste Divisie promotion playoffs: 2019

References

External links

Halil Dervişoğlu at brentfordfc.com
Halil Dervişoğlu at burnleyfootballclub.com

1999 births
Living people
Footballers from Rotterdam
Citizens of Turkey through descent
Turkish footballers
Turkey international footballers
Turkey youth international footballers
Turkey under-21 international footballers
Dutch footballers
Dutch people of Turkish descent
Association football forwards
Sparta Rotterdam players
Brentford F.C. players
Tweede Divisie players
Eerste Divisie players
Eredivisie players
English Football League players
Turkish expatriate footballers
Dutch expatriate footballers
Expatriate footballers in England
Turkish expatriate sportspeople in England
Dutch expatriate sportspeople in England
FC Twente players
Galatasaray S.K. footballers
Süper Lig players
UEFA Euro 2020 players
Premier League players
Burnley F.C. players